Libertybowl Branch is a stream in the U.S. state of West Virginia.

The name Libertybowl most likely is derived from liberty pole.

See also
List of rivers of West Virginia

References

Rivers of Nicholas County, West Virginia
Rivers of West Virginia